Pestalotiopsis disseminata is a fungal plant pathogen infecting bananas.

References

External links
 USDA ARS Fungal Database

Fungal plant pathogens and diseases
Banana diseases
disseminata